The Ontario Liberal Party held a leadership election in 1943 to choose a permanent replacement to Mitchell Hepburn who had been forced to resign at the end of 1942. Because the Ontario Liberal Party was in power, the winner of the race would also become premier of the province. Initially, Hepburn attempted to anoint Gordon Daniel Conant as his permanent successor but the caucus did not accept this and forced a full leadership convention which was won on the first ballot by former Provincial Secretary Harry Nixon.

As Conant was ailing and had been hospitalized, Thomas McQuesten was Acting Premier on the day of the leadership convention.

Candidates
Thomas McQuesten, 60, MPP for Hamilton—Wentworth since 1934, Minister of Public Works and Highways (1934-1937, 1943), Minister of Municipal Affairs (1940-1943) 
Harry Nixon, 52, MPP for Brant since 1919, Provincial Secretary and Registrar of Ontario under E.C. Drury and Mitchell Hepburn (1919-1923, 1934-1942), first elected as a United Farmers of Ontario MPP (1919-1926), then as a Progressive (1926-1934) and Liberal-Progressive (1934-1937), Leader of the Progressives (1929-1934) and Liberal-Progressives (1934-1937)
Arthur Roebuck, 65, MP for Trinity since 1940, former MPP for Bellwoods (1934-1949), Attorney-General of Ontario under Hepburn (1934-1937)
Walter Thomson, 48, Lawyer and rancher in Hastings County

Premier Gordon Daniel Conant had also been a candidate but collapsed hours before the leadership vote and withdrew as a candidate.

Results
Results were as follows:
NIXON, Harry 418
ROEBUCK, Arthur 85
McQUESTEN, Thomas 40
THOMSON, Walter 22
There were 8 spoiled ballots.

See Ontario Liberal leadership conventions

References

Leaders of the Ontario Liberal Party
1943
1943 elections in Canada
Ontario Liberal Party leadership election